You Know What Sailors Are is a 1954 British comedy film directed by Ken Annakin and starring Donald Sinden, Michael Hordern, Bill Kerr, Dora Bryan and Akim Tamiroff. The screenplay by Peter Rogers was based on the 1951 novel Sylvester by Edward Hyams. It was shot at Pinewood Studios and on location around the Isle of Portland. The film's sets were designed by the art director George Provis.

Plot
Three British naval officers out on a drunken spree attach a pram and a pawnbroker's sign to the stern of a foreign naval ship. The next morning, an officer misinterprets the pram and sign as state of the art, top-secret radar equipment. Instantly, the British navy decrees that their ships be fitted with the same device. Thereafter, bureaucratic misunderstandings escalate into a major international incident.

Cast 

 Akim Tamiroff as President of Agraria
 Donald Sinden as Lt. Sylvester Green
 Sarah Lawson as Betty
 Naunton Wayne as Captain Owbridge
 Bill Kerr as Lt. Smart
 Dora Bryan as Gladys
 Martin Miller as Prof. Hyman Pfumbaum
 Michael Shepley as Admiral
 Michael Hordern as Captain Hamilton
 Ferdy Mayne as Stanislaus Voritz of Smorznigov
 Bryan Coleman as Lt. Comdr. Voles
 Cyril Chamberlain as Stores Officer
 Hal Osmond as Stores Petty Officer
 Peter Arne as Ahmed
 Sara Leighton as Jasmin
 Janet Richards as Almyra
 Eileen Sands as 	Hepzibah
 Marianne Stone as 	Elsie – Barmaid
 Peter Dyneley as Lt. Andrews
 Peter Martyn as 	Lt. Ross
 Robertson Hare as Lt. Cdr. (Experimental Station) 
 Anthony Sharp as 	Humphrey - Naval Attache 
 Leslie Phillips as Embassy Secretary 
 Peter Barkworth as Naval Lieutenant 
 Martin Benson as 	Agrarian Officer
 Shirley Eaton as 	Palace Girl 
 Lisa Gastoni as 	Palace Girl 
 Hermione Harvey as Dancer

Production
Peter Rogers bought the screen rights to Edward Hyams' book and says he wrote 14 drafts before Earl St John agreed to make the film. Rogers wanted Kenneth More to star but St John refused (Genevieve had yet to be released) so Donald Sinden was cast instead. Ken Annakin arranged for Julian Wintle to produce which annoyed Rogers.

Critical reception
TV Guide writes, "beautiful women fill the screen at frequent intervals in this amiable comedy"; and AllMovie writes, "You Know What Sailors Are top-bills Akim Tamiroff as the president of a mythical Foreign country, but the film belongs to Donald Sinden as the well-meaning young officer who precipitates the whole affair."

References

External links
 

1954 films
British comedy films
1954 comedy films
Films directed by Ken Annakin
Films shot at Pinewood Studios
Films based on British novels
Films with screenplays by Peter Rogers
Films produced by Peter Rogers
Military humor in film
Films scored by Malcolm Arnold
1950s English-language films
1950s British films